The Nordic Journal of Human Rights is a peer-reviewed academic journal published by the Norwegian Centre for Human Rights (part of the Faculty of Law at the University of Oslo) in collaboration with Universitetsforlaget. The journal takes a broad and cross-disciplinary view on human rights, particularly in a Nordic context.

In the Norwegian Association of Higher Education Institutions’ ranking of scientific journals (Norwegian Scientific Index), the journal is ranked as a Level 2 journal (Level 2 comprises up to the 20% most prestigious journals in any discipline, in this case law).

The journal was established in 1982 and was originally published as a Scandinavian-language journal, titled Mennesker og Rettigheter (Humans and Rights). It was renamed Nordisk tidsskrift for menneskerettigheter (Nordic Journal of Human Rights) in 2004. In 2010, the journal became an English-language journal, and was renamed Nordic Journal of Human Rights.

References

External links 
 

Law journals
Human rights journals
University of Oslo
English-language journals
Publications established in 1982
Universitetsforlaget academic journals
1982 establishments in Norway
Academic journals associated with universities and colleges